Utica City FC is a professional indoor soccer team based in Utica, New York that plays in the Eastern Conference of the Major Arena Soccer League.

History
The team formed in 2011 as the Syracuse Silver Knights with the intention of playing in the new I-League (a United Soccer Leagues league set to begin play in 2011), but the team moved to the Major Indoor Soccer League when the two leagues merged. The team was rumored to be named the Syracuse Scorpions and revive the name of an old American Soccer League team. However, the name Silver Knights was announced at the team's inaugural press conference.

The club is coached by former Silver Knights player, Ryan Hall, who replaced goalkeeper Bryan O'Quinn, who replaced club President, Team Owner and Syracuse native Tommy Tanner for the 2016–17 season.

The club has signed former Syracuse Salty Dogs player Ryan Hall, among others. The team announced the signing of former Major League Soccer star Diego Serna on October 11, 2011.

The Syracuse Silver Knights' first season of play began in 2011–12 when they joined the MISL as an expansion franchise. For their inaugural season, the Silver Knights played their home games at the Oncenter War Memorial Arena in downtown Syracuse.

The team finished third in the Eastern Division in 2012, having been eliminated from playoff contention when the Rochester Lancers beat the Wichita Wings on February 23, 2012.

In 2013, the Silver Knight Foundation was launched to help benefit kids in tough economic and social situations. The foundation hosts events throughout the year which helps raise money for these children. Many Silver Knights players, including reserve and U19 players, volunteer their time to help partake in the events.

After the 2013–2014 season, the team announced that it was leaving the MISL along with five other teams joining the PASL, which was subsequently renamed the MASL.

On June 13, 2018, the team announced that it had partnered with the Utica Comets of the AHL and would be moving to Utica as Utica City FC for the 2018-19 season. The team did not play during the 2021 season due to the COVID-19 pandemic.

Players

Active roster
Updated May 21, 2020

Inactive roster

Year-by-year

Club staff 

 President: Robert Esche
 Vice-president: Adam Pawlick
 CFO: Michael Potrzeba
 Executive Administrator: Luann Horton-Murad
 General Manager: Tommy Tanner
 VP Corporate Partnerships: Alicia Leone-Desarro
 VP Marketing: Cecelie Pikus
 VP Creative Services: Eric Kowiatek
 Head coach: Hewerton Moriera

Kits

Rivalries

Utica City FC's main rival is the Baltimore Blast. It existed in their days as the Syracuse Silver Knights and has extended to Utica City FC when the team relocated. Both teams have won five games in the series since their first meeting on December 2, 2018, a 4–2 win for Utica City. The Rochester Lancers are also considered a rival of Utica City FC. Rochester is two hours away from Utica and are Utica's closest opponent by proximity. The first matchup of this rivalry took place on November 29, 2019, with Utica City defeating Rochester by a 9–1 score.

References

External links
 Official Site
 Major Arena Soccer League official site

Indoor soccer clubs in the United States
Major Arena Soccer League teams
2018 establishments in New York (state)
Utica, New York
Men's soccer clubs in New York (state)
Association football clubs established in 2018